John Mullan may refer to:
John Mullan (academic), professor of English at University College London
John Mullan (Australian politician) (1871–1941)
John Mullan (road builder) (1830–1909), American soldier, explorer and road builder
John B. Mullan (1863–1955), New York state senator
John Eddie Mullan (1923–2008), Irish Gaelic footballer

See also
John Mullane (born 1981), Irish Gaelic footballer